Bellis hyrcanica is a species of daisy in the genus Bellis and is native to Europe. This species grows mainly in temperate biomes. The name was published in 1916.

References

hyrcanica